Andrea Mannai (born 2 May 1963) is a retired male boxer from Italy, who won the bronze medal at the 1987 European Amateur Boxing Championships in the men's flyweight (– 51 kg) division. He represented his native country at the 1988 Summer Olympics and lost to Arthur Johnson of the United States on a 5-0 decision.

References
 
 

1963 births
Living people
People from the Province of Cagliari
Sportspeople from Sardinia
Flyweight boxers
Boxers at the 1988 Summer Olympics
Olympic boxers of Italy
Italian male boxers